Robina Town Centre is the second largest shopping center on the Gold Coast, Australia after the recently redeveloped Pacific Fair, covering  in the suburb of Robina, with seven anchor tenants and over 400 retail outlets covering over .

History 

Construction began on the center in 1994 on land that was previously paddocks and bushland, and it was at the time the largest mall in Australia to be built in a single development period. Stage One of the development opened in late April 1996, and Stage Two, with two extra levels of shopping, opened in late August 1996. The original stages were characterized by a central courtyard with a clocktower, fountains and masonry structures, open-air avenues, and a foot court raised on a large balcony.

The center has since been taken over by the Queensland Investment Corporation from the original developers Robina Land Corporation and development and refurbishment has occurred in 2002–03, 2006–2010 and 2014–15. The development which was completed in 2010 cost , and further change is planned. There were a number of events to celebrate the 10th birthday of the center in 2006, including celebrity visits and children's events.

In 1998, the center received a commendation from the Royal Australian Institute of Architects. Robina Library was housed on a lower level of Robina Town Centre near the lake until relocating off-site in 2000.

In 2007, the Robina Town Centre commenced on a $300 million extension, which opened in April 2009. These works added a second Woolworths supermarket, a large scale  Big W (which opened as the largest Big W store in Australia), a two-storey Borders Book Store, a new entertainment and leisure precinct surrounding the lake including new cinemas and restaurants, a new state of the art 900-seat Food Atrium, plus over 100 new stores and an additional 1,100 parking spaces. The clocktower, food court and central courtyard were removed, and the surrounding alfresco promenades were roofed.

In 2010, Robina Town Centre completed a $90 million expansion with the addition of a Myer store (in the location of the previous Event Cinemas) plus 12 new fashion stores in a new mall linking Arbour Lane to the food markets.

In May 2015, a new mall opened adjacent to Market Hall with a  Super Coles Store and an additional  of retail space. Stage 2B of Market Hall (The Kitchens) opened in late 2016 with 55 new retailers. Also scheduled for a revamp is the food atrium which is set to be completed in September 2016. Further development commenced in May 2016 with The Central Malls Project starting which will link the existing West and East fashion malls, the new mall is set to become the bustling heart of Robina Town Centre offering completely new flagship brands and outlets as well as approximately 45 new specialty stores. The Central Malls Project has opened in 2018. It included a two-level H&M.

The shopping centre has five themed malls Arbour Lane, Bazaar Street, Food Markets, Fashion Mall (Crescent West) and the North Mall.

Parking and Transportation
Robina Town Centre has an intelligent parking system, with parking assist bays and empty parking indicators to assist in finding a space. With approximately 6,000 car parks available, mostly undercover, the parking assist works using sensors above parks with LED indicators if a park is empty (green) or taken (red). These sensors communicate with the directional flow indicators on the main thoroughfare that blink in the direction of an empty parking bay. There are 85 parking bays for those who are disabled that are undercover and an additional 12 open aired parking bays located at the Food markets car park. There are 50 parents with pram parking bays, with extra-wide bays located in various sections of each car park area.

The parking lot of Robina Town Center has a heightened security system. Robina Town Centre is within walking distance of Robina station and Robina Stadium and is serviced by multiple Surfside Buslines routes and trains from Brisbane to Varsity Lakes that operate in the area. The bus stop is not well-signed within the centre but can be located near Target, which is signed.

See also

 List of shopping centres in Australia

References

External links

 Robina Town Centre website

Robina_Town_Center
Shopping malls established in 1996
1996 establishments in Australia
Robina, Queensland